Cal Northern School of Law is a private law school located in Chico, California. Cal Northern offers a four-year night program.

Accreditation
The school has been approved by the Committee of Bar Examiners of the State Bar of California since 1992, but is not accredited by the American Bar Association.

Notable alumni
 Sergio C. Garcia, first undocumented immigrant to be admitted to the State Bar of California
 Rick Keene, former member of the California State Assembly

References

External links
 

Law schools in California
Education in Chico, California
Educational institutions established in 1992
Private universities and colleges in California
1983 establishments in California